Francien is a 19th-century term in linguistics that was applied to the French dialect that was spoken in the Île-de-France region (with Paris at its centre) before the establishment of the French language as a standard language.

According to one theory of the development of French, Francien was chosen out of all the competing oïl languages as an official language (Norman and Picard being the main competitors in the medieval period). The theory currently prevailing, however, is that Francien was one of the dialects in the dialect continuum on top of which an administrative language, untrammeled by perceived regionalisms, was imposed as a compromise means of communication and record to replace Latin.

The existence and definition of Francien were put forward in the 19th century, partly to support the idea of the French language as enjoying a direct and pure lineage from Latin and to minimize the contributions of the various Romance languages of France. Nowadays, the question of Francien is a controversial topic in discussions of language policy in France.

See also
Old French
Ordinance of Villers-Cotterêts
Jordain de Blaivies, a chanson de geste in this dialect

Notes

Oïl languages
Obsolete scientific theories
Spurious languages